The Amalgamated Association of Miners (AAM) was formed in 1869 in Lancashire, at a time of increasing industrial conflict in the British coalfields.

History
The union was founded by Thomas Halliday and William Pickard, two miners' union agents who had grown disillusioned with the cautious approach of the Miners' National Union (MNU) of Alexander Macdonald.  In contrast, they placed an emphasis on being a centralised union, offering systematic support for local strikes.  Founded on 23 August 1869, Halliday served as its president, and he called a national conference for January 1870.

The 1870 conference attracted delegates from Wales and Staffordshire, in addition to Lancashire, and established it as a national organisation.  While differing from Macdonald's union, it was happy to collaborate on matters of mutual agreement, and Macdonald spoke at several AAM conferences.

By June 1871, the union had 9,000 members in the Aberdare and Rhondda valleys, and in the same year won a major twelve-week strike in Aberdare and the Rhondda in 1871, cementing its position in South Wales.

A second major strike in South Wales in 1873 was also successful, while miners in Lancashire saw their wages rise greatly without having to take industrial action. However, from mid-1873, mine-owners formed their own organisations to target the union, while a downturn in the industry combined to see the union decline.

In 1874, Halliday sought election as MP for Merthyr Boroughs but although he polled well he was comfortably defeated by the sitting Liberal members, Henry Richard and Richard Fothergill.

The last great industrial battle fought by the AAM was in 1874 but Halliday's hardline stance was rejected by the majority of his followers. Thereafter the AAM went into rapid decline.  By 1875, it was bankrupt.  It was dissolved at a conference held in Shrewsbury on 24 August, with members advised to join the MNU, and Halliday taking a place on its committee.

In 1877, a new Amalgamated Association of Miners was formed, based on the surviving districts in South Wales.  Halliday was again secretary, while William Abraham was president, and Edward Williams of Aberdare was treasurer.  Although Halliday devoted three years to the union, it was unsuccessful.

Districts
By the 1873 conference, the union claimed 99,399 members, located in a large number of districts.  The union's policy was to admit miners in any unrepresented location as a new district, then in the longer term, to merge small districts together.

References

Sources

Mining trade unions
Trade unions established in 1869
Trade unions disestablished in the 1870s